When Love Was Blind refers to the following films:

 When Love Was Blind (1911 film)
 When Love Was Blind (1917 film)